Bernard (797 – 17 April 818) was the King of Italy from 810 to 818. He plotted against his uncle, Emperor Louis the Pious, when the latter's Ordinatio Imperii made Bernard a vassal of his cousin Lothair. When his plot was discovered, Louis had him blinded, a procedure which killed him.

Life
Bernard was born in 797, the son of King Pepin of Italy, himself the son of the Emperor Charlemagne. In 810, Pepin died from an illness contracted at the siege of Venice. Bernard married a woman named Cunigunde, but the year of their marriage, and her origins, are obscure. Some sources refer to her as "of Laon". They had one son, Pepin, Count of Vermandois, who was born in 817.

In 817, Louis the Pious drew the Ordinatio Imperii, detailing the future of the Frankish Empire. Under this, the bulk of the Frankish territory went to Louis' eldest son, Lothair; Bernard received no further territory, and although his kingship of Italy was confirmed, he would be a vassal of Lothair, as he had been to Louis and to Charles. Certain of his counselors, including Count Eggideo, and his chamberlain Reginhard, persuaded Bernard that arrangement threatened his position. Other names were Reginhar, the last being the grandson of a Thuringian rebel against Charlemagne, and Hardrad. Anshelm, Bishop of Milan and Theodulf, Bishop of Orléans, were also accused of being involved: there is no evidence either to support or contradict this in the case of Theodulf, whilst the case for Anshelm is murkier.

Prior to this, Bernard's relationship with his uncle appears to have been cooperative. Bernard's main complaint was the notion of his being a vassal of Lothair. In practical terms, his actual position had not been altered at all by the terms of the decree, and he could safely have continued to rule under such a system. Nonetheless, "partly true" reports came to Louis the Pious that his nephew was planning to set up an 'unlawful'—i.e. independent—regime in Italy.

Louis the Pious reacted swiftly to the plot, marching south to Chalon. Bernard and his associates were taken by surprise; Bernard travelled to Chalon in an attempt to negotiate terms, but he and the ringleaders were forced to surrender to Louis, who had them taken to Aachen where they were tried and condemned to death. Louis 'mercifully' commuted their sentences to blinding, which would neutralize Bernard as a threat without actually killing him; however, the process of blinding (carried out by means of pressing a red-hot stiletto to the eyeballs) proved so traumatic that Bernard died in agony two days after the procedure was carried out. At the same time, Louis also had his half-brothers Drogo, Hugh and Theoderic tonsured and confined to monasteries, to prevent other Carolingian offshoots challenging the main line. He also treated those guilty or suspected of conspiring with Bernard harshly: Theodulf of Orleans was imprisoned, and died soon afterwards; the lay conspirators were blinded, the clerics deposed and imprisoned; all lost lands and honours.

A text called The Vision of the Poor woman of Laon criticizes Louis for Bernard's death.

Legacy

His Kingdom of Italy was reabsorbed into the Frankish empire, and soon after bestowed upon Louis' eldest son Lothair. In 822, Louis made a display of public penance at Attigny, where he confessed before all the court to having sinfully slain his nephew; he also welcomed his half-brothers back into his favour. These actions possibly stemmed from guilt over his part in Bernard's death. It has been argued by some historians that his behaviour left him open to clerical domination, and reduced his prestige and respect amongst the Frankish nobility. Others, however, point out that Bernard's plot had been a serious threat to the stability of the kingdom, and the reaction no less a threat; Louis' display of penance, then, "was a well-judged gesture to restore harmony and re-establish his authority."

References

797 births
818 deaths
9th-century kings of Italy
Herbertien dynasty
Monarchs of the Carolingian Empire
Frankish warriors
Medieval child monarchs